Farmington Historic District is the town center of Farmington, Michigan. It was listed on the National Register of Historic Places in 1976.  The area roughly corresponds to the section of Grand River Avenue and Shiawassee Avenue from Warner Street to junction of Grand River and Shiawassee.

History
In 1823, Arthur Power, a devout Quaker originally from Farmington, New York, purchased a number of tracts of land in this area. He moved to Michigan in 1824 with his family, and a number of other Quaker families followed suit. By 1826, the location of the village of Farmington was firmly established along Shiawassee Trail, and the settlement boasted at least three churches, a school, two taverns, and several other merchants. There were also several dairies and cheese factories, a small foundry, and at least four lumber and grist mills. A number of residences - some still extant - were constructed in the "Old City" area of Farmington. By the mid 1840s, the village center shifted from Shiawassee Trail to Grand River.

The village grew rapidly from about 1850 to 1890, with the original Quaker influence gradually diminishing as new settlers moved in. The surrounding agricultural industry was the dominant economic driver for the area. A disastrous fire struck in 1872, destroying many businesses in the commercial district. After 1890, Farmington continued to grow as technology and transportation evolved, but even by 1950 the population was only 2300.

Description
The Farmington Historic District is triangular in shape, and consists primarily of residential buildings, with the remainder mostly commercial in nature. Some structures date back to the 1840s, with a great may farm houses and modest Greek Revival structures.

The district includes some significant buildings in Farmington:
Governor Fred M. Warner House, a symmetric, block shaped house with a low hipped roof topped by a cupola, built in 1867.
The Masonic Lodge (formerly Township Hall), a two-story building with towers, corbels, arched doorways and a mansard roof in patterned slate, completed in 1876.
Farmington Civic Theatre

Gallery

References

External links

Farmington Historical Commission

Buildings and structures in Farmington, Michigan
Historic districts on the National Register of Historic Places in Michigan
National Register of Historic Places in Oakland County, Michigan
Geography of Oakland County, Michigan